Aenictus raptor is a species of light brown army ant found in the Democratic Republic of the Congo.

References

Dorylinae
Hymenoptera of Africa
Insects described in 1913